The 551st Signal Battalion is an active duty unit of the United States Army, housed on Fort Gordon. The MACOM for the 551st is (TRADOC) and they fall directly under the 15th Signal Brigade.
The 551st trains the following Signal Corps MOSs:

25B – Information Technology Specialist
25H – Network Communication Systems Specialist 
25N – Nodal Network System Operator/Maintainer
25S – Satellite Communications Systems Operator/Maintainer

Additional Skills Identifier (ASI)
25S 1C – Satellite Systems Network Coordinator

History
551st Signal Battalion Lineage
Constituted 10 December 1941 in the Army of the United States as the 551st Signal Aircraft Warning Battalion, Separated
Activated 15 December 1941 at Fort Dix, New Jersey
Redesignated 12 December 1942 as the 551st Signal Aircraft Warning Battalion
Inactivated 1 February 1946 in the Philippine Islands
Redesignated 23 September 1986 as the 551st Signal Battalion and allotted to the Regular Army; Headquarters concurrently transferred to the United States Army Training and Doctrine Command and activated at Fort Gordon, Georgia

Structure 
Alpha Company - Prior service Soldiers obtaining a new MOS

Bravo Company - 25S – Satellite Communications Systems Operator/Maintainer Soldiers

Charlie Company - 25N – Nodal Network System Operator/Maintainer and 25B – Information Technology Specialist Soldiers 

Delta Company - 25B – Information Technology Specialist Soldiers

Echo Company - 25B – Information Technology Specialist Soldiers

SSD - 25M – Multimedia Illustrators, 25R – Visual Information Equipment Operator/Maintainer, 25V – Army Combat Documentation/Production Specialist, and 46S – Public Affairs Mass Communication Specialist Soldiers

Honors
Campaign Participation Credit
World War II: Northern Solomons; Leyte; Southern Philippines

Decorations
Philippine Presidential Unit Citation for 17 October 1944 to 4 July 1945
Company A additionally entitled to:
Army Superior Unit Award for 1999–2000

References

External links
 https://web.archive.org/web/20100610200859/http://www.signal.army.mil/551/index.htm

Signal battalions of the United States Army